The Sanctuarium is a columbarium situated along Gregorio Araneta Avenue in Quezon City, Metro Manila, Philippines.

History
The Sanctuarium was established in 2006. Initially, only 18 percent of the Sanctuarium's patrons preferred cremation over traditional burial but by 2012, it was reported that this figure rose to 60 percent. The Sanctuarium is one of the biggest columbariums in Asia, with its current capacity housing 25,000 vaults. Almost half of this figure has already been sold and as of 2012, the establishment already inters 2,000 remains.

Facilities
The Sanctuarium is hosted inside a 12-storey building with 4 basement parking levels. It hosts 28 vigil chapels, a cafe called the Genki Japanesque Café, and a flower shop. Edward Co Tan +Architects was responsible for the building design.

The columbarium is one of the largest in Southeast Asia, capable of housing 25,000 vaults. The building has 50,000 more vaults located in soon-to-be-operational levels.

References

Buildings and structures in Quezon City
Columbaria